Huallen is a hamlet in northern Alberta, Canada within the County of Grande Prairie No. 1.

Demographics 
Huallen recorded a population of 28 in the 1991 Census of Population conducted by Statistics Canada.

See also 
List of communities in Alberta
List of hamlets in Alberta

References 

County of Grande Prairie No. 1
Hamlets in Alberta